Tagant may refer to:
 Tagant Region, a region in south-central Mauritania
 Tagant Plateau, a land area in eastern Mauritania